The SS William and Mary was a Victory ship built during World War II.

Service life
SS William and Mary Victory was part of the series of Victory ships named after educational institutions, in this case, the College of William and Mary.  Her design type was VC2-S-AP2/WSAT.  Her Maritime Commission (MCV) hull number was 652 and her shipyard number was 1597. She was built by Bethlehem Shipbuilding Corporation in Baltimore, Maryland.

She was launched and christened on 20 April 1945.  Her sponsor was Eleanor Harvey, the retiring president of the Women Students' Cooperative Government Association at the College of William and Mary and a member of the class of 1945.  U.S. Naval Air Corps Lieutenant Robert Eastman, an alumnus of the College, pushed the button that released the ship into the water. Edie Harwood, president of the Women Students' Cooperative Government Association, was Harvey's maid of honor.

SS William and Mary Victory served in the Atlantic Ocean in World War II operated by the International Freighting Company. She served as a troop ship take troop to Europe.  On April 17, 1946 she departed Le Havre, France for New Jersey, bring home troops. On January 25, 1946 she streamed into New York to bring troops home. SS William and Mary Victory arrived in New York from Antwerp on February 26, 1946, with  1.457 troops, including 381st Engineer Combat Battalion and 34Sth Engineer Combat Battalion.
SS William and Mary Victory and 96 other Victory ships were converted to troop ships to bring the US soldiers home as part of Operation Magic Carpet.

After WW2 in 1946, she was laid up in the James River. In 1947 she was sold to Compana Argentina de Nav.Dodero, in Buenos Aires, Argentina and renamed Mendoza. In 1949 she was sold to Flota Argentina se Nav. de Ultramar in Buenos Aires. In 1952 she was rebuilt as a passenger ship with accommodation. In 1961 she was sold to Empresa Líneas Marítimas Argentinas, in Buenos Aires, converted back to a to cargo ship. In 1972 she was scrapped at Campana, Buenos Aires, Argentina.

Artifacts 
The christening bottle for the SS William and Mary Victory is in the Special Collections Research Center (SCRC) in Swem Library at the College of William and Mary. An American flag that was flown on the ship is also available in the SCRC. The flag was a gift of Captain James Hassell on May 2, 1946.

See also
 Liberty ship - Previous cargo ship.
 List of Victory ships
 Type C1 ship
 Type C2 ship
 Type C3 ship

References 

1945 ships
SS
World War II merchant ships of the United States
Victory ships
Troop ships of the United States